The Expanded Psionics Handbook is a sourcebook written by Bruce Cordell for the 3.5 edition of the Dungeons & Dragons fantasy roleplaying game that contains rules and options for integrating psychic powers (also known as psionics) into the game. Along with its predecessor, the Psionics Handbook, the Expanded Psionics Handbook expands and adapts the psionics concept with a new emphasis on balance and playability.

Contents 

The Expanded Psionics Handbook contains a system for adding psionics to Dungeons and Dragons. Psionics use a different system from traditional D&D spellcasting, using a point pool to track a character's power usage.

The Expanded Psionics Handbook introduces four Base Classes, several prestige classes alters some rules and includes a new system for becoming psionically focused.  The base classes are the psion and psychic warrior (both of which are reprints from the Psionics Handbook), the wilder, and the Soulknife.  The prestige classes are the Cerebremancer, Elocater, Fist of Zuoken, Illithid Slayer, Metamind, Psion Uncarnate, Pyrokineticist, Thrallherd and the War Mind.

The Handbook also contains four new psionic races—the dromites, elan, maenads, and xelphs—provides psionic versions of dwarves, githyanki, githzerai, and yuan-ti. It adds several new psionic monsters, including the intellect devourer and temporal filcher, and adds the phrenic template, which can make any Dungeons and Dragons creature a psionic creature.

Publication history 

The Expanded Psionics Handbook was published in 2004. Cover art was by Henry Higginbotham, with interior art by Steven Belledin, Brian Despain, Wayne England, Lars Grant-West, Heather Hudson, Jeremy Jarvis, Chuck Lukacs, David Martin, Monte Moore, Jim Pavelec, Wayne Reynolds, Arnie Swekel and Sam Wood.

This book is intended as a 3.5 adaptation and revision of the Psionics Handbook for 3rd Edition, which was released in 2001. It was adapted for several reasons, including changes to the core D20 system and balance concerns. Some players considered psions to be weaker than wizards and sorcerers.

Reception 

The reviewer from Pyramid found the book's prestige classes "more imaginative, with beings who leave their physical form behind for a life of mental existence, hunters who kill illithids, and the irresistibly heroic Fist of Zuoken".

Other reviewers, such as RPGnet, were less positive. Reviewer Jesse Heinig said, "As an expansion for all manner of psionic-themed characters, the Complete Psionic book provides more depth and more unusual powers. Sadly, it lacks a little in breadth and some of its last-minute changes are evident around the frayed edges."

References 

Dungeons & Dragons sourcebooks
Role-playing game supplements introduced in 2004